Doris Mackinnon (30 September 1883 – 10 September 1956) was a British zoologist. Born in Scotland, her father was a Consular Agent and her mother managed a "women's home". Influenced by Maria Gordon, Mackinnon studied botany and geology at Aberdeen University, graduating in 1906. She received the "Carnegie scholarship", studying abroad for two years before returning to Scotland. She achieved her doctorate from Aberdeen University in 1914, becoming a lecturer at University College, Dundee (the forerunner of the University of Dundee, but then a part of the University of St Andrews) in 1916.

During World War I, Mackinnon worked in military hospitals in Britain, researching and helping to diagnose amoebic dysentery. Her work in the military hospitals fuelled her interest in the topic, which she focused on during the following years. In 1919, Mackinnon joined King's College London as a lecturer and became Chair of Zoology in 1927, the first female Chair at the college. She remained in the role as Chair and professor for 22 years. Her research work focused on parasitic protozoa, and she gave many lectures on the subject over the period of 30 years. She also gave broadcast lectures for schools.

Biography
Doris Livingston Mackinnon was born on 30 September 1883 in Aberdeen. Her father, Lachlan Mackinnon, worked as an advocate and Consular Agent for France and Belgium. In his spare time, he was an amateur scientist, interested in botany, ornithology and astronomy. Her mother, Theodora Thompson Mackinnon, granddaughter of George Thompson, founded and managed a "women's home" for unemployed women. Mackinnon had three siblings. One sister became a silhouette artist whilst the other, Lillias Mackinnon, became a concert pianist. A brother became an author.

Encouraged by Maria Gordon, Mackinnon studied botany and geology at Aberdeen University, receiving her BSc in 1906 with a distinction. She was awarded the "Carnegie scholarship", affording her the chance to study for a year under Richard Hertwig in Munich. Afterward, she joined Milano Vlès to research at Station biologique de Roscoff and then relocated to the Quick Laboratory under George Nuttall. Mackinnon returned to Aberdeen in 1908, where she became an assistant to John Arthur Thomson at Aberdeen University. In 1909, she became an assistant to D'Arcy Thompson at University College, Dundee. Whilst there, she worked on her thesis "Studies on protozoa", which she submitted to Aberdeen University in 1914, receiving her doctorate. Within two years, in 1916, Mackinnon was promoted to lecturer in Dundee.

Whilst at Dundee, Mackinnon was given a leave of absence to help with the war effort during World War I. She worked in military hospitals in Liverpool and Southampton, where she used her knowledge of protozoology to help diagnose amoebic dysentery and other infections for the War Office. In 1918, she was recalled to University College, Dundee, as D'Arcy Thompson had taken a new role at St Andrews University, Mackinnon became the acting head of zoological department.

Mackinnon joined King's College London, first as a lecturer in 1919 under Arthur Dendy; she was promoted to reader two years later. When Julian Huxley resigned as Chair of Zoology in 1927, Mackinnon stepped up to the role which held also the title of Professor, where she would remain until her retirement in 1949. In doing so, Mackinnon became the first female chair at King's College. Her department produced notable academics such as Francis Brambell. After retiring, Mackinnon worked on an undergraduate textbook, "An introduction to the study of protozoa". She fell ill before it was published, eventually dying from a stroke on 10 September 1956, so the book was completed and edited by R. S. J. Hawes.

Work

Between May 1917 and May 1918, Mackinnon worked at the University War Hospital in Southampton with William Fletcher from the Royal Army Medical Corps, focusing on the diagnosis and treatment of dysentery. The pair focused on two forms of Shigella dysenteriae which had been identified by Simon Flexner and Kiyoshi Shiga. They discovered that the Flexner bacillus could go into intermission and be undetectable for periods of four to five weeks, making it very difficult to say when someone was no longer a carrier. They also found that men who were carriers of Shiga's bacillus would be prone to depression and would be no longer fit to be soldiers.

Mackinnon published over 40 academic papers, primarily on parasitic species of protozoa (especially flagellates and sporozoa). She had a reputation for her skill as a lecturer, which stemmed from her time at University College, Dundee. Mackinnon gave broadcast talks for schools and numerous lectures, with a reputation that she never repeated a lecture in 30 years of teaching. These included lectures on the diseases spread by flies, and how good hygiene and the prevention of flies breeding could stop typhoid. She also set up a research centre in protozoology, the only non-medical protozoological research centre in Britain.

Recognition
During the 1930s, two genus of protozoa, Dorisa and Dorisiella, were named after Mackinnon in recognition of her work. In 1943, for the 50th anniversary of their first women's admissions, Aberdeen University awarded Mackinnon and two other women an honorary LL.D. When Mackinnon retired in 1949, she was elected professor emeritus of King's College. She became a fellow of the Linnean Society of London and served on their council.

Selected bibliography
Books

Journals articles

References

1883 births
1956 deaths
Scottish zoologists
Academics of King's College London
Alumni of the University of Aberdeen
Fellows of the Linnean Society of London
Scientists from Aberdeen
Academics of the University of Dundee
Academics of the University of St Andrews
20th-century British zoologists